Indodynerus is a monotypic genus of potter wasps known from India and Pakistan with a single described species Indodynerus capitatus.

References

Potter wasps
Monotypic Hymenoptera genera